Diving is one of the sports at the biennial Universiade competition. It has been one of the event's competed sports since the 1961 Games. After not being included in 1975 and 1989.

Events

Medal table 
Last updated after the 2019 Summer Universiade

References
Sports123

 
Sports at the Summer Universiade
Universiade